Church Songs is the third live album from Vertical Church Band. Essential Worship released the album on January 20, 2015. They worked with Jacob Sooter in the production of this album.

Critical reception

Awarding the album four stars at New Release Today, Kevin Davis states, "This is a truly fresh and catchy set of excellent songs for the Church." Joshua Andre, rating the album four stars from 365 Days of Inspiring Media, writes, "Vertical Church Band has done it again!" Giving the album four stars by Louder Than the Music, Jono Davies says, "they seem easy to pick up without being overly simplistic, not an easy task, but one Vertical Church Band have done very well." Reviewing the album for AllMusic, Timothy Monger describes, "Vertical Church Band offers ambitious, warm-toned pop songs with a spiritual message."

Awards and accolades
This album was No. 10, on the Worship Leader'''s Top 20 Albums of 2015 list.

The song, "Spirit of the Living God", was No. 7, on the Worship Leader'''s Top 20 Songs of 2015 list.

Track listing

Chart performance

References

2015 live albums
Essential Records (Christian) albums